Costa Rica participated in the 2011 Parapan American Games.

Athletics

Costa Rica sent seven male athletes to compete.

Cycling

Costa Rica sent six male athletes to compete. Three male athletes competed in the road cycling tournament, while three male athletes competed in the track cycling tournament.

Powerlifting

Costa Rica sent one male athlete to compete.

Sitting volleyball

Costa Rica sent a team of twelve athletes to compete.

Table tennis

Costa Rica sent five male table tennis players to compete.

Nations at the 2011 Parapan American Games
2011 in Costa Rican sport
Costa Rica at the Pan American Games